Richard Kemp, is the Deputy Chair of the Community Wellbeing Board at the Local Government Association of England & Wales, and was previously the Leader of the Liberal Democrats in Local Government and Vice Chair of the Local Government Association of England & Wales for over seven years until August 2011.  A member of Liverpool City Council for 38 years, he is also Leader of the Liberal Democrats and opposition on the Council. Cllr Kemp has been a member of the Board of the Local Authority Mutual Investment Trust since 2011 and its Chair since 1 January 2019. He was awarded the CBE in 2011 for Public Service

Between 2006 and 2016 he was the UK representative on the Executive Bureau, Finance Board and the World Council of United Cities and Local Government, the global body for local government. After assisting with the rebuilding of the pan-African section of the global body UCLGA between 2007 and 2009  he has been an adviser on governance and scrutiny since 2010 advising on both the work of councils and of local government associations.

Outside politics Richard is the Chair of QS World Merit a global charity which helps young people get involved in delivering the UN's Strategic Development Goals (SDGs) in more than 150 Countries.

Richard is married to Erica Kemp CBE who served as a Liverpool Councillor for 23 years and was the Lord Mayor  of  Liverpool 2014/15. They have 3 children, Jonathan, Emma and Rachel and 5 grandchildren Eva, Jonah, Raphael, Caladh and Mairi. They are the only married couple to both have a CBE.

Kemp has three times stood for Parliament for the Liberal Democrats in the Liverpool Wavertree constituency, finishing second in  1997 and third in both 2017 and 2019.

References

Liberal Democrats (UK) politicians